Ulli may refer to:

 Pulkovo Airport (ICAO airport code ULLI)
 Cyclone Ulli,  an intense and deadly European windstorm, forming on December 31, 2011, off the coast of New Jersey and dissipating January 7, 2012

See also
Uli (disambiguation)